Andrews v Gas Meter Company (1884) LR 25 Ch D 320 is a UK company law case concerning the right of a company to amend its constitution to enable the issuing of preferential shares.

Facts
The company, incorporated under the 1856 and then the 1862 Acts, had £60,000 of share capital, divided into 600 £100 shares, each subdivisible by five. Capital could be increased according to art 27 by the general meeting. New shares would be the same as old shares, and there was no mention of priority or preference shares. The company wished to buy a meter manufacturing business that was in administration from one John West, and wished to change its articles to allow preferential shares to be allotted to him, as part of the consideration for the deal. There would be 100 £100 shares, carrying a preferential dividend of £5 each.

Judgment
Lindley LJ held that the company could issue the preferential shares. A company cannot deprive itself of the power to amend its articles by special resolution. He noted,

See also

UK company law

Notes

References

United Kingdom company case law
Court of Appeal (England and Wales) cases
1884 in case law
1884 in British law